The Kharkov Governorate (pre-reform Russian: , tr. Khárkovskaya gubérniya, IPA: [ˈxarʲkəfskəjə ɡʊˈbʲernʲɪjə]) was a governorate of the Russian Empire founded in 1835. It embraced the historical region of Sloboda Ukraine. From 1765 to 1780 and from 1796 to 1835 the governorate was called the Sloboda Ukraine Governorate. In 1780-1796 there existed the Kharkov Viceroyalty.

From 1765 to 1780, the Sloboda–Ukraine Governorate existed. In 1780, the Kharkov Viceroyalty was established and lasted until 1796. In 1835, the Viceroyalty was again reorganized into the Sloboda-Ukrainian Governorate, and from 1835 onwards, the Kharkov Governorate was formed, which existed until 1925. With each reorganization, the boundaries and administrative structure change significantly. The main state tax implementation, processing, and publishing of statistical information for the Kharkov governorate were the Kharkov Governorate Statistical Committee.

History 

Slobozhanshchyna, with its capital in Kharkov, had become the official name of the Sloboda-Ukrainian Governorate in 1765. Catherine II signed a decree creating the Kharkov Viceroyalty on April 25, 1780. It was formed of the uezds of Akhtyrsky Uyezd, Belopolsky, Bogodukhovsky Uyezd, Valkovsky, Volchansky Uyezd, Zolochevsky, Izyumsky Uyezd, Krasnokutsky, Lebedinsky Uyezd, Miropolsky, Nedrigailovsky, Sumsky Uyezd, Kharkovsky Uyezd, Khotmyzhsky, and Chuguevsky. The Viceroyalty was abolished in 1796, and the Sloboda-Ukrainian Governorate was re-established on the Kharkov Viceroyalty's territory, divided into 10 uezds: Akhtyrsky Uyezd, Bogodukhovsky, Valkovsky, Volchansky Uyezd, Zmievsky, Izyumsky Uyezd, Kupyansky Uyezd, Lebedinsky Uyezd, Sumsky Uyezd, and Kharkovsky Uyezd.

In 1835, the Sloboda-Ukrainian Governorate was abolished once more, and the Kharkov Governorate was established in its place, consisting of 11 counties. In the same year, the Kharkov Governorate was incorporated to the Little Russian Governor-General. The Governor-residence General was originally in Poltava but has been in Kharkov since 1837. By 1856, the governorate had grown to 13 counties, and the final administrative division had been established. Kharkov was the seat of the Orthodox Kharkov Diocese and the Kharkov Educational District, as well as the judicial authority for the governorates of Kharkov, Kursk, Voronezh, Oryol, Yekaterinoslav, and Tambov, and the Kharkov Military District administration from 1864 to 1888. The governorate's territory was excluded from the "Pale of Settlement". Nevertheless, Jews were permitted to visit Kharkov during the fairs.

The newspaper Kharkovskie Gubernskie Vedomosti was first published in 1838. The Zemstvo was founded as part of the Zemstvo reform. On , the terrorist G. Goldenberg assassinated Governor D. N. Kropotkin. General M. T. Loris-Melikov was appointed temporary governor-general of the Kharkov Governorate on April 7, 1879, and commanding officer of the Kharkov Military District on April 17, the same year.

The Izyumsky and Starobelsky uezds of Kharkov Governorate were transferred to the newly established Donetsk Governorate in 1920. Zmiev uezd was split into Zmiev and Chuguevsky uezds in December 1919. The government of the Ukrainian SSR adopted a new system of administrative division of the republic's territory on March 7, 1923, by Decree of the Presidium of the All-Ukrainian Central Executive Committee No. 315 of March 7, 1923. Okrugs and raions replaced uyezds and volosts. Instead of 10 uezds, the governorate was divided into 5 okrugs, as well as 227 volosts divided into 77 raions. Kharkov Governorate was divided into okrugs, according to the new administrative-territorial division system, Raion–Okrug–Governorate–Capital: Kharkov (24 raions), Bogodukhovsky (12 raions), Izyumsky (11 raions), Kupyansky (12 raions), and Sumy (16 raions).

All of the Ukrainian SSR's governorates, including Kharkov, were abolished in June 1925, and the governorate's okrugs were transferred to the Ukrainian SSR's direct subordination (with its capital in Kharkiv). Based on a decision of the 9th All-Ukrainian Congress of Soviets, the All-Ukrainian Central Executive Committee signed a decree on June 3, 1925, establishing a new territorial division throughout the Ukrainian SSR based on the principle of a three-stage system of government (without governorates): Okrug–Raion–Capital. The Kharkiv Oblast was formed on February 27, 1932, by the resolution of the Central Executive Committee.

Demographics

1897 Russian Census
By the Imperial census of 1897. In bold are languages spoken by more people than the state language.

Uyezds of Kharkov Governorate

Notes

References and notes

Further reading

External links
 Kharkiv Governorate at the Encyclopedia of Ukraine

 
Governorates of the Russian Empire
Governorates of Ukraine
History of Kharkiv Oblast
States and territories established in 1780
States and territories disestablished in 1918
1780 establishments in the Russian Empire